The 10th Nova Scotia general election may refer to:

Nova Scotia general election, 1811, the 10th general election to take place in the Colony of Nova Scotia, for the 10th General Assembly of Nova Scotia
Nova Scotia general election, 1901, the 32nd overall general election for Nova Scotia, for the (due to a counting error in 1859) 33rd Legislative Assembly of Nova Scotia, but considered the 10th general election for the Canadian province of Nova Scotia.